David John Chalmers (born 20 April 1966) is an Australian philosopher and cognitive scientist specializing in the areas of philosophy of mind and philosophy of language. He is a professor of philosophy and neural science at New York University, as well as co-director of NYU's Center for Mind, Brain and Consciousness (along with Ned Block). In 2006, he was elected a Fellow of the Australian Academy of the Humanities. In 2013, he was elected a Fellow of the American Academy of Arts & Sciences.

Chalmers is best known for formulating the hard problem of consciousness. He and David Bourget cofounded PhilPapers, a database of journal articles for philosophers.

Early life and education 
Chalmers was born in Sydney, New South Wales, in 1966, and subsequently grew up in Adelaide, South Australia, where he attended Unley High School.

As a child, he experienced synesthesia. He began coding and playing computer games at age 10 on a PDP-10 at a medical center. He also performed exceptionally in mathematics, and secured a bronze medal in the International Mathematical Olympiad. When Chalmers was 13 he read Douglas Hofstadter's 1979 book Gödel, Escher, Bach, which awakened an interest in philosophy.

Chalmers received his undergraduate degree in pure mathematics from the University of Adelaide in Australia. After graduating Chalmers spent six months reading philosophy books while hitchhiking across Europe, before continuing his studies at the University of Oxford, where he was a Rhodes Scholar but eventually withdrew from the course. In 1993, Chalmers received his PhD in philosophy and cognitive science from Indiana University Bloomington under Douglas Hofstadter, writing a doctoral thesis entitled Toward a Theory of Consciousness. He was a postdoctoral fellow in the Philosophy-Neuroscience-Psychology program directed by Andy Clark at Washington University in St. Louis from 1993 to 1995.

Career 
In 1994, Chalmers presented a lecture at the inaugural Toward a Science of Consciousness conference. According to an article in the Chronicle of Higher Education, this "lecture established Chalmers as a thinker to be reckoned with and goosed a nascent field into greater prominence." He went on to coorganize the conference (now renamed "The Science of Consciousness") for some years with Stuart Hameroff, but stepped away when it became too divergent from mainstream science. Chalmers is also a founding member of the Association for the Scientific Study of Consciousness, as well as one of its past presidents.

Having established his reputation, Chalmers received his first professorship the following year, at UC Santa Cruz, from August 1995 to December 1998. In 1996, while teaching there, he published the widely cited book The Conscious Mind. Chalmers was subsequently appointed Professor of Philosophy (1999–2004) and, subsequently, Director of the Center for Consciousness Studies (2002–2004) at the University of Arizona, sponsor of the conference that had first brought him to prominence. In 2004, Chalmers returned to Australia, encouraged by an ARC Federation Fellowship, becoming professor of philosophy and director of the Center for Consciousness at the Australian National University. Chalmers accepted a part-time professorship at the philosophy department of New York University in 2009, and then a full-time professorship there in 2014.

In 2013, Chalmers was elected a Fellow of the American Academy of Arts & Sciences. He is an editor on topics in the philosophy of mind for the Stanford Encyclopedia of Philosophy. In May 2018, it was announced that he would serve on the jury for the Berggruen Prize.

Philosophical work

Philosophy of mind 

Chalmers is best known for formulating what he calls the "hard problem of consciousness," in both his 1995 paper "Facing Up to the Problem of Consciousness" and his 1996 book The Conscious Mind. He makes a distinction between "easy" problems of consciousness, such as explaining object discrimination or verbal reports, and the single hard problem, which could be stated "why does the feeling which accompanies awareness of sensory information exist at all?"  The essential difference between the (cognitive) easy problems and the (phenomenal) hard problem is that the former are at least theoretically answerable via the dominant strategy in the philosophy of mind: physicalism. Chalmers argues for an "explanatory gap" from the objective to the subjective, and criticizes physicalist explanations of mental experience, making him a dualist. Chalmers characterizes his view as "naturalistic dualism": naturalistic because he believes mental states supervene "naturally" on physical systems (such as brains); dualist because he believes mental states are ontologically distinct from and not reducible to physical systems. He has also characterized his view by more traditional formulations such as property dualism.

In support of this, Chalmers is famous for his commitment to the logical (though, not natural) possibility of philosophical zombies. These zombies are complete physical duplicates of human beings, lacking only qualitative experience. Chalmers argues that since such zombies are conceivable to us, they must therefore be logically possible. Since they are logically possible, then qualia and sentience are not fully explained by physical properties alone; the facts about them are further facts. Instead, Chalmers argues that consciousness is a fundamental property ontologically autonomous of any known (or even possible) physical properties, and that there may be lawlike rules which he terms "psychophysical laws" that determine which physical systems are associated with which types of qualia.  He further speculates that all information-bearing systems may be conscious, leading him to entertain the possibility of conscious thermostats and a qualified panpsychism he calls panprotopsychism. Chalmers maintains a formal agnosticism on the issue, even conceding that the viability of panpsychism places him at odds with the majority of his contemporaries. According to Chalmers, his arguments are similar to a line of thought that goes back to Leibniz's 1714 "mill" argument; the first substantial use of philosophical "zombie" terminology may be Robert Kirk's 1974 "Zombies vs. Materialists".

After the publication of Chalmers' landmark paper, more than twenty papers in response were published in the Journal of Consciousness Studies.  These papers (by Daniel Dennett, Colin McGinn, Francisco Varela, Francis Crick, and Roger Penrose, among others) were collected and published in the book Explaining Consciousness: The Hard Problem. John Searle critiqued Chalmers' views in The New York Review of Books.

With Andy Clark, Chalmers has written "The Extended Mind", an article about the borders of the mind.

Philosophy of language 

Chalmers has published works on the "theory of reference" concerning how words secure their referents. He, together with others such as Frank Jackson, proposes a kind of theory called two dimensionalism arguing against Saul Kripke. Before Kripke delivered the famous lecture series Naming and Necessity in 1970, the descriptivism advocated by Gottlob Frege and Bertrand Russell was the orthodoxy. Descriptivism suggests that a name is indeed an abbreviation of a description, which is a set of properties or, as later modified by John Searle, a disjunction of properties. This name secures its reference by a process of properties fitting: whichever object fits the description most, then it is the referent of the name. Therefore, the description is seen as the connotation, or, in Fregean terms, the sense of the name, and it is via this sense by which the denotation of the name is determined.

However, as Kripke argued in Naming and Necessity, a name does not secure its reference via any process of description fitting. Rather, a name determines its reference via a historical-causal link tracing back to the process of naming. And thus, Kripke thinks that a name does not have a sense, or, at least, does not have a sense which is rich enough to play the reference-determining role. Moreover, a name, in Kripke's view, is a rigid designator, which refers to the same object in all possible worlds. Following this line of thought, Kripke suggests that any scientific identity statement such as "Water is H2O" is also a necessary statement, i.e. true in all possible worlds. Kripke thinks that this is a phenomenon that the descriptivist cannot explain.

And, as also proposed by Hilary Putnam and Kripke himself, Kripke's view on names can also be applied to the reference of natural kind terms. The kind of theory of reference that is advocated by Kripke and Putnam is called the direct reference theory.

However, Chalmers disagrees with Kripke, and all the direct reference theorists in general. He thinks that there are two kinds of intension of a natural kind term, a stance which is now called two dimensionalism. For example, the words,

"Water is H2O"

are taken to express two distinct propositions, often referred to as a primary intension and a secondary intension, which together compose its meaning.

The primary intension of a word or sentence is its sense, i.e., is the idea or method by which we find its referent. The primary intension of "water" might be a description, such as watery stuff. The thing picked out by the primary intension of "water" could have been otherwise. For example, on some other world where the inhabitants take "water" to mean watery stuff, but where the chemical make-up of watery stuff is not H2O, it is not the case that water is H2O for that world.

The secondary intension of "water" is whatever thing "water" happens to pick out in this world, whatever that world happens to be. So if we assign "water" the primary intension watery stuff then the secondary intension of "water" is H2O, since H2O is watery stuff in this world. The secondary intension of "water" in our world is H2O, and is H2O in every world because unlike watery stuff it is impossible for H2O to be other than H2O. When considered according to its secondary intension, water means H2O in every world. Via this secondary intension, Chalmers proposes a way simultaneously to explain the necessity of the identity statement and to preserve the role of intension/sense in determining the reference.

Philosophy of verbal disputes 
In some more recent work, Chalmers has concentrated on verbal disputes. He argues that a dispute is best characterized as "verbal" when it concerns some sentence S which contains a term T such that (i) the parties to the dispute disagree over the meaning of T, and (ii) the dispute arises solely because of this disagreement. In the same work, Chalmers proposes certain procedures for the resolution of verbal disputes. One of these he calls the "elimination method", which involves eliminating the contentious term and observing whether any dispute remains.

Technology and virtual reality 
Chalmers addressed the issue of virtual and non-virtual worlds in his 2022 book Reality+. While Chalmers recognises that virtual reality is not the same as non-virtual reality, he does not consider virtual reality to be an illusion, but rather a "genuine reality" in its own right. Chalmers sees virtual reality as potentially offering as meaningful a life as non-virtual reality, and argues that we could already be inhabitants of a simulation without knowing it.

Chalmers proposes that computers are forming a form of "exo-cortex", where a part of human cognition is 'outsourced' to corporations such as Apple and Google.

Media 
Chalmers was featured in the 2012 documentary film entitled The Singularity by filmmaker Doug Wolens, which focuses on the theory proposed by techno-futurist Ray Kurzweil, of that "point in time when computer intelligence exceeds human intelligence." He was a featured philosopher in the Daily Nous series on GPT-3, which he described as "one of the most interesting and important AI systems ever produced."

Personal life 
Chalmers is the lead singer of the Zombie Blues band, which performed at the music festival Qualia Fest in 2012 in New York.
Chalmers is in a relationship with Claudia Passos Ferreira, a philosopher and psychologist from Rio de Janeiro.
Regarding religion, Chalmers has said: "I have no religious views myself and no spiritual views, except watered-down humanistic, spiritual views. And consciousness is just a fact of life. It's a natural fact of life."

Bibliography 
 The Conscious Mind: In Search of a Fundamental Theory (1996). Oxford University Press. hardcover: , paperback: 
 Toward a Science of Consciousness III: The Third Tucson Discussions and Debates (1999). Stuart R. Hameroff, Alfred W. Kaszniak and David J. Chalmers (Editors). The MIT Press. 
 Philosophy of Mind: Classical and Contemporary Readings (2002). (Editor). Oxford University Press.  or 
 The Character of Consciousness (2010). Oxford University Press. hardcover: , paperback: 
 Constructing The World (2012). Oxford University Press. hardcover: , paperback:  
 Reality+: Virtual Worlds and the Problems of Philosophy (2022). W. W. Norton & Company. Hardcover:

Notes

External links 

 
 An in-depth autobiographical interview with David Chalmers
 "The Singularity" a documentary film featuring Chalmers
 The Moscow Center for Consciousness Studies video interview with David Chalmers
 

1966 births
20th-century Australian philosophers
21st-century Australian philosophers
Alumni of Lincoln College, Oxford
Analytic philosophers
Australian humanists
Academic staff of the Australian National University
Australian Rhodes Scholars
Consciousness researchers and theorists
Epistemologists
Fellows of the Australian Academy of the Humanities
Fellows of the American Academy of Arts and Sciences
Indiana University Bloomington alumni
International Mathematical Olympiad participants
Lecturers
Living people
Metaphysicians
New York University faculty
Ontologists
Philosophers of language
Philosophers of mind
Philosophers of science
Philosophy writers
Quantum mind
University of Adelaide alumni